Pierre Véron may refer to:

 Pierre Véron (writer) (1833–1900), French writer and journalist
 Pierre Véron (lawyer) (born 1947), French lawyer and specialist in the field of patent litigation